Brotherhood of Electric: Operational Directives is the second studio album by the American rock band Wellwater Conspiracy. It was released on February 9, 1999, through Time Bomb Recordings.

Overview 
The album was recorded in 1998. The band worked with the producer Adam Kasper. The album was mixed by the band members themselves. This is the first Wellwater Conspiracy album to include Matt Cameron on lead vocals. The album has a guest appearance by rock musician Josh Homme of Queens of the Stone Age and Kyuss. The album's cover art was created by Cameron. Greg Prato of Allmusic said Wellwater Conspiracy "offer another intriguing collection of 60's-tinged ditties." Teen Lambchop was played live at the first Queens of the Stone Age concert which McBain and Cameron were members of at the time.

Track listing

Personnel 

Wellwater Conspiracy
 Matt Cameron – drums, vocals, guitars, bass guitar, keyboards, artwork
 John McBain – guitars, bass guitar, keyboards, screams

Additional musicians and production
 April Cameron – viola on "Hal McBlaine", "B.O.U.", and "Dr. Browne Dr. Greene"
 Justine Foy – cello on "Hal McBlaine", "B.O.U.", and "Dr. Browne Dr. Greene"
 Rebecca Keith – violin on "Hal McBlaine", "B.O.U.", and "Dr. Browne Dr. Greene"
 Luke St. Kimble – vocals on "B.O.U."
 Gerry Amandes – bass guitar on "Hal McBlaine", keyboards on "Jefferson Experiment"
 Glenn Slater – keyboards, synthesizer, piano on "Hal McBlaine", "Born With a Tail", "Red Light, Green Light", "B.O.U." and "Jefferson Experiment"
 Josh Homme – vocals on "Teen Lambchop", "Red Light, Green Light", and "Ladder to the Moon", bass guitar on "Ladder to the Moon" and "Good Pushin'"
 John Golden – mastering
 John Burton – mixing assistance
 Adam Kasper – production
 Wellwater Conspiracy – production, mixing

References

External links 
 Brotherhood of Electric: Operational Directives information at nowinvisibly.com

1999 albums
Albums produced by Adam Kasper
Time Bomb Recordings albums
Wellwater Conspiracy albums
Albums produced by Matt Cameron